The 2016 GT Series Sprint Cup (known for sponsorship reasons as the 2016 Blancpain GT Series Sprint Cup) was the fourth season following on from the demise of the SRO Group's FIA GT1 World Championship (an auto racing series for grand tourer cars), the third with the designation of Blancpain Sprint Series or Blancpain GT Series Sprint Cup. After developing their partnership, Blancpain and the SRO decided that 2016 would see both the Sprint and Endurance Series further integrated into the Blancpain GT Series, putting the emphasis on the prestigious overall drivers' and manufacturers' titles causing the Sprint Series name to change from Blancpain Sprint Series to Blancpain GT Series Sprint Cup.

Calendar
The series started at Misano World Circuit Marco Simoncelli on 10 April and ended at Circuit de Barcelona-Catalunya in Spain on 2 October. The calendar was reduced to five events, dropping races at Nogaro, Moscow, Algarve, Zolder  and Zandvoort, with the addition of races at Hungaroring and Nürburgring.

Entry list

Race results
Bold indicates overall winner.

Championship standings
Scoring system
Championship points were awarded for the first six positions in each Qualifying Race and for the first ten positions in each Main Race. The pole-sitter in the Qualifying Race also received one point and entries were required to complete 75% of the winning car's race distance in order to be classified and earn points. Individual drivers were required to participate for a minimum of 25 minutes in order to earn championship points in any race.

Qualifying Race points

Main Race points

Drivers' championships

Overall

Pro-Am Cup

Silver Cup

Notes
1 – Stuart Leonard and Michael Meadows received points toward the Silver Cup championship, despite the fact that they were not classified.

Am Cup

Teams' championships

Overall

Pro-Am Cup

Am Cup

See also
2016 Blancpain GT Series
2016 Blancpain GT Series Endurance Cup

Notes

References

External links

 Sprint Cup
Blancpain GT Series Sprint Cup